is a 2008 Japanese animated short subject film created by Kunio Katō, with music by Kenji Kondo and produced by Robot Communications and animated by Oh! Production.

It won several prizes, including The Annecy Cristal at the 32nd Annecy International Animated Film Festival and the Academy Award for Best Animated Short Film at the 81st Academy Awards. It was also included in the Animation Show of Shows in 2008.

Plot
As his town is flooded by water, an aged widower is forced to add additional levels on to his home in order to stay dry. But when he accidentally drops his favourite smoking pipe into the lower submerged levels of his home, his search for the pipe eventually makes him relive scenes from his eventful life (including his time before the flooding began).

Accolades
La Maison en Petits Cubes has won the following awards:

2008 Hiroshima International Animation Festival
 Hiroshima Prize
 Hiroshima Prize
2008 Japan Media Arts Festival
 Grand Prize – Animation Division
2008 Annecy International Animated Film Festival
 Junior Jury Award
 The Annecy Cristal
2009 Academy Awards
 Best Animated Short Film
2008 Message to Man
 Best Animated Film
2008 Anima Mundi
 Best Script – Jury Award
2008 LA Shorts Fest
 Best Animation

References

External links
 
 

2008 films
2008 anime films
2000s animated short films
Anime short films
Best Animated Short Academy Award winners